The Edward Moody King House is a historic house in Dyersburg, Tennessee, U.S.. It was built in 1905-1907 for Edward Moody King and his wife, Mary Stevens. It was designed by George Mahan, Jr. in the Colonial Revival architectural style. It has been listed on the National Register of Historic Places since October 25, 1990.

References

Houses on the National Register of Historic Places in Tennessee
Colonial Revival architecture in Tennessee
Houses completed in 1905
Houses in Dyer County, Tennessee
1905 establishments in Tennessee